

Overview
Tipperary were one of the few counties that contested the first championship in 1887. Every year since that, they have contested in the Munster and All-Ireland Championship.

Notes:
There were no provincial championships played in 1887, rather an open draw.
The championship of 1888 was unfinished.
NOTE: In 1911, Munster Champions Limerick refused to play Kilkenny in the All-Ireland final, Tipp took their place.
NOTE: The first league championship was in 1926.
NOTE: The 1926-27 league was not played.
NOTE: The 1931-32 league was not played.
NOTE: Foot and Mouth kept Tipp from playing the 1941 championship. They played the real Munster final, beating Cork later in the year. A makeshift Munster final was made for the time being.
NOTE: Between 1942-1945, the league was cancelled due to the war.

External links
Official website

Seasons
Seasons Tipperary
Tipperary